Below is a list of Oceanian national football team managers. This encompasses every football manager who currently manages a national team under the control of the Oceania Football Confederation (OFC) or any other national regional body.

See also
List of European national football team managers
List of South American national football team managers
List of North American national soccer team managers
List of African national football team managers
List of Asian national football team managers

References